Annet Nakimbugwe is a Ugandan footballer who plays as a midfielder. She has been a member of the Uganda women's national team.

Club career
Nakimbugwe has played for Source de Kivu in the Democratic Republic of the Congo, for APR FC in Rwanda and for Buikwe She Red Stars in Uganda.

International career
Nakimbugwe capped for Uganda at senior level during the 2000 African Women's Championship and the 2002 African Women's Championship qualification.

International goals
Scores and results list Uganda goal tally first

Controversy
After Uganda withdrew from the 2004 African Women's Championship qualification prior the preliminary round matches against Malawi, Nakimbugwe and fellow Ugandan footballer Oliver Mbekeka moved abroad. Being in the Democratic Republic of the Congo, they were naturalized there as Annette Nshimire and Oliva Amani, respectively, and represented the country at the 2006 FIFA U-20 Women's World Championship. She also played the following edition in 2008.

Personal life
Nakimbugwe's daughter, Hasifah Nassuna, is also a footballer and both have faced each other in Ugandan women's league matches.

References

External links

Living people
Sportspeople from Kampala
Ugandan women's footballers
Women's association football midfielders
APR F.C. players
Uganda women's international footballers
Ugandan expatriate women's footballers
Ugandan expatriate sportspeople in Rwanda
Expatriate footballers in Rwanda
Year of birth missing (living people)